The  is an indoor arena in Chiba, Japan.
Chiba Jets Funabashi plays some games here as the second home arena.

Facilities
Main arena - 2,730 sqm （63.5m×40m）
Sub arena - 769.6 sqm （38.0m×22m）

Events
Volkswagen Ogimura Cup 2007 (Table Tennis)
The 65th All Japan Gymnastics Championships
Yonex BWF World Junior Badminton Championships
2014 Japan Para wheelchair rugby competitions
The 68th All Japan Gymnastics Championship
2014 All Japan High School Sports Meeting (Badminton)
2021 Asian Men's Volleyball Championship

Access
Chiba Monorail: 8-min walk from Shiyakusho-mae Station.
Train: 16-min walk from Chiba Station.
Alternatively, 15-min walk from Chibaminato Station. (JR Keiyo Line); or take monorail to Shiyakusho-mae Station, and 12-min walk from Chiba Chuo Station (Keisei Line).
Bus: From Chiba Sta. or Chiba Chuo Sta. Get off at Port Arena.
Alternatively, Chiba Kaihin Kotsu Bus for Saiwaimachi Danchi, Inage Kaigan, Kaihin Hospital. Get off at Port Arena.

References

Chiba Jets Funabashi
Sports venues in Chiba (city)
Indoor arenas in Japan
Basketball venues in Japan
Sports venues completed in 1991
1991 establishments in Japan